Parachan (also Romanized as Parāchān) is a village in Bala Taleqan Rural District, in the Central District of Taleqan County, Alborz Province, Iran. At the 2006 census, its population was 292, in 79 families.this village is a way to more than 30 peaks up to 3000 m highth from see. one of best hiking ways to alam kuh is from taleqan and parachan. Most of population of this village called eftekhari. and they are very religious. They have a traditional religious ceremony at ashoura  day( 10th of moharram month) .  First Iranians who conquered the alam kuh peak were two brothers from this village.

References 

Populated places in Taleqan County